Terrence Michael Crowley (born February 16, 1947) is an American former professional baseball player and coach. He played in Major League Baseball as an outfielder and utility player from  through , most notably as a member of the Baltimore Orioles dynasty that won three consecutive American League pennants from 1969 to 1971 and, won the World Series in 1970. He serves as an organizational hitting instructor for the Baltimore Orioles. Crowley has been inducted into the Staten Island Sports Hall of Fame.

Playing career
Crowley played for the Orioles from 1969 to 1973 and from 1976 to 1982. He was a backup player who could play the outfield and first base. When the designated hitter rule was implemented, he was the first Oriole to fulfill this role. However, he was best known during his playing career for being a pinch hitter. As of the end of the 2011 season, Crowley's 108 career pinch-hits is still the 13th-most all-time, tying him with Denny Walling. Teammate Jim Palmer called him "a really great pinch hitter who studies pitchers to get himself psyched to hit."

Crowley's contract was sold by the Orioles to the Texas Rangers at the Winter Meetings on December 6, 1973. He never appeared in a regular-season contest with the Rangers, as he was claimed off waivers by the Cincinnati Reds during spring training on March 19, 1974. He was traded from the Reds to the Atlanta Braves for Mike Thompson on April 7, 1976.

In 865 games over 15 seasons, Crowley compiled a .250 batting average (379-for-1,518) with 174 runs, 62 doubles, 1 triple, 42 home runs, 229 RBI, 222 base on balls, 181 strikeouts, .345 on-base percentage and .375 slugging percentage. He posted a .987 fielding percentage. In 13 post-season games, all in a pinch-hitting role (3 WS, 2 ALCS, 1 NLCS), he hit .273 (3-for-11) with 3 RBI.

Coaching career
Crowley has served as the hitting coach for the Baltimore Orioles from 1985 through 1988, the Minnesota Twins from 1991 through 1998, and the Orioles again from 1999 through 2010. Crowley served as a roving hitting instructor in the Orioles organization in 2011. He was an interim bullpen coach in 2011, following Mark Connor's resignation and the subsequent promotion of bullpen coach Rick Adair.  In 2014, Crowley worked with Oriole Chris Davis on his hitting.

Personal life
Crowley attended Curtis High School after graduating he attended Long Island University, Brooklyn Campus, before being drafted by the Orioles in 1966.

References

Sources

1947 births
Living people
American expatriate baseball players in Canada
Atlanta Braves players
Baltimore Orioles coaches
Baltimore Orioles players
Baseball coaches from New York (state)
Cincinnati Reds players
Curtis High School alumni
Elmira Pioneers players
LIU Brooklyn Blackbirds baseball players
Major League Baseball designated hitters
Major League Baseball first base coaches
Major League Baseball hitting coaches
Major League Baseball left fielders
Major League Baseball right fielders
Miami Marlins (FSL) players
Minnesota Twins coaches
Montreal Expos players
Rochester Red Wings players
Sportspeople from Staten Island
Baseball players from New York City